The Philips Lecture was a lecture organised by the Royal Society of London with support from Philips Industries Limited in 1980, the object being to strengthen contacts between the Society and industry and more generally between universities and industry. The general theme of the series was science in industry. The lecture was annual and was given for the last time in 1992.

List of lecturers

References 

Annual events in the United Kingdom
1980 establishments in the United Kingdom
1992 disestablishments in the United Kingdom
Innovation in the United Kingdom
Recurring events established in 1980
Recurring events disestablished in 1992
Research and development in the United Kingdom
Royal Society lecture series
Technology history of the United Kingdom
Universities in the United Kingdom